Jeajoon Ryu (born 1970) is a South Korean composer. His works have been by performed some of the world’s leading orchestras, such as the Royal Philharmonic Orchestra (RPO), l'Orchestre régional de Cannes-Provence-Alpes-Côte d’Azur (ORCPACA), the Helsinki Philharmonic Orchestra (Helsingin kaupunginorkesteri), and the Polish Radio Symphony Orchestra. He was the artistic director of Seoul International Music Festival from 2009-2010 and a composer of Poland Gozow Philharmonic Orchestra from 2011-2012. Artists such as Arto Noras, Michel Lethiec, Ralf Gothoni, Li-Wei Qin, Shanghai Quartet, Juyung Baek, So-Ok Kim, Johannes Moser and Ilya Gringolts were performed his works.

Education
He studied composition under Krzysztof Penderecki at Kraków Music Academy as well as under Kang, Suk-hi at Seoul National University.

Career
His music has been given numerous critically acclaimed around the world and at the Cadogan Hall, Verdi Hall in Milan, Warsaw Philharmonic Concert Hall, and Helsinki Music Centre.  He was invited to the Naantali Music Festival (Finland) and Mecklenburg Music Festival (Germany) as guest composer and jury member of international Violin Competition of Astana.

His violin concerto and Sinfonia da Requiem were recorded on Naxos International Label in (2009), and his violin sonata was recorded on Telos Music (2010). In 2015 he has been honored by the Polish Minister of Culture and received the National Heritage the Gloria Artis Medal. 

Currently, Ryu is the Artistic Director of the Seoul International Music Festival in Korea. He also founded Ensemble OPUS and became Artistic Director.

Recordings 
 RYU, Jeajoon: Sinfonia da Requiem / Violin Concerto No. 1 CD, 2008 Naxos
 RYU, Jeajoon: Sonata for Violin and Piano 'Spring' CD, 2010 telos
 RYU, Jeajoon: Cello Concerto / Marimba Concerto / Overture: Il nome della Rosa CD, 2016 RPO

Works 
Symphony
 Sinfonia da Requiem For Soprano, Choir and Orchestra (2007)

Orchestral Works
 Overture “Il nome della Rosa” (2010)
 Cantata ‘Rubna Crux’ (1999)
 Symphonic Poem (1996)

String Orchestra		
 Sinfonietta per archi (2015)
 'Rosso' for Strings (2008)

Concerto
 Concerto per piano e orchestra (2017)
 Concerto per marimba e orchestra (2015)
 String Quartet Concerto (2013)
 Concerto per violoncello ed orchestra (2010)
 Concerto per violin ed orchestra (2006)
 Cello Concerto No. 1 (2001)

Chamber
 Quintetto per clarinetto e quartetto d'archi (2015)
 Sonata per violin e pianoforte No.2 (2014)
 Sonata per clarinetto e pianoforte (2013)
 Quintet per marimba e string quartet (2012)
 String Quartet (2012)
 Sonata per violoncello e pianoforte (2011)
 ‘Early summer’ Trio per violin, violoncello e pianoforte (2009)
 Sonata ‘Primavera'per violino e pianoforte No.1 (2008)
 Bach in our Age for Piano trio (2001)
 Saxophone Sonata (2000)
 Dialogue per Violin, Clarinet e Pianoforte (1995)

Electronic Music		
 The Bright Light for Electronic Sound (1997)

Solo
 Baroque suite per pianoforte (2013)
 Caproccio per violino (2012) 
 Fugues (2004)
 Passacaglia per Percussion (2002)

References

1970 births
Living people
21st-century classical composers
South Korean classical composers
South Korean musicians